Thawi Bunyaket (also spelt Thawee Bunyaget; , ; 10 November 1904 – 3 November 1971) was a Thai politician and the prime minister for a short term.

Early life and education
After studying at the King's College, University of Cambridge and the École nationale supérieure d'Agronomie de Grignon (France), he started to work as a government official at the Ministry of Agriculture.

Political careers
On 24 June 1932 he joined the coup group of the 1932 coup, the People's Party. He became secretary general in the cabinet of Field Marshal Phibunsongkhram, and Minister of Education in the cabinet of Khuang Abhaiwongse. When Khuang resigned directly after the end of World War II, he was elected as prime minister on 31 August 1945 and formed the 12th Thai administration. However he was only chosen because the preferred candidate Seni Pramoj, chief  of the Free Thai Movement, wasn't available. Seventeen days after his election, on 17 September, he resigned to free the post for Seni Pramoj.

Later he became President of the Constitutional Drafting Committee in the government of Field Marshal Sarit Thanarat.

Honours and awards

Civil Service of Siam rank
 Assistant of Ministry of Agriculture and Cooperatives (Siam)

References

See also
 Biography at the Thai government

Thawi Bunyaket
Thawi Bunyaket
1904 births
1971 deaths
Thawi Bunyaket
Thawi Bunyaket
Thawi Bunyaket
Thawi Bunyaket
Thawi Bunyaket
Thawi Bunyaket
Thawi Bunyaket
Thawi Bunyaket
Thawi Bunyaket
Thawi Bunyaket
Thawi Bunyaket